Starfire Soccer Challenge is a video game by Purple Moon, released in November 1998.

Plot and gameplay
The game sees the player control an all-girls soccer team. The game sees a continuation of the characters from Rockett's New School and Secret Paths.

Production
The game's pioneering design was, like other Purple Moon titles, built off of years of research. At the time, American women were close to winning the World Cup, and women's soccer had become important to the target market. The research impacted both the plot and the user interface (UI) of the title. It became the first sports CD-ROM designed for girls. While boys' sports games have superstar athletes, this game was designed to have girl next door characters that the player could relate to. Sarah Stocker served as the game's producer.

Critical reception
The game received a more positive reception from feminists than Purple Moon's other games. Brenda Laurel: Pioneering Games for Girls noted the game took a fresh take on the sports game. The journal article Stuck on Screens: Patterns of Computer and Gaming Station Use in Youth Seen in a Psychiatric Clinic described the game as an "outstanding example of digital technology supporting positive emotional development".

The game received a 1999 D.I.C.E award nomination for Computer Children's Entertainment Title of the Year.

References

1998 video games
Association football video games
Video games developed in the United States
Windows games
Windows-only games